Patrick Gill may refer to:

 Patrick F. Gill (1868–1923), US representative from Missouri
 Patrick Gill (scientist), British physicist

See also
 John Creasey (pen name Patrick Gill)